Robert Kuwałek (1966 – 5 June 2014) was a Polish historian, noted for his work on the history of the Jewish community in the Lublin area and on the Holocaust. He worked at the Majdanek State Museum. 2004–2007 he directed the Museum in Belzec, a new branch of Majdanek State Museum.

Selected books and other publications
Belzec : le premier centre de mise à mort. Paris: Calmann-Lévy, 2013, http://calmann-levy.fr/livres/belzec/

Lublin. Jerozolima Królestwa Polskiego, with Wiesław Wysok, Lublin: Współpraca i Dialog, 2001, http://www.biblioteka.teatrnn.pl/dlibra/dlibra/docmetadata?id=8793&from=publication

"The Ghetto in Lublin," translated by Sophie Frankenberg (née Mendelson), http://www.benchmark.co.il/lublin/The%20ghetto%20in%20Lublin-%20robert%20kuwalek-e.pdf

Bibliography
 Obituary at Jewish Heritage Europe, http://www.jewish-heritage-europe.eu/2014/06/08/polish-holocaust-historian-robert-kuwalek-rip/%E2%80%9D
 Kuwałek's biography in Leksykon Lublin, Ośrodek Brama Grodzka-Teatr NN, http://teatrnn.pl/leksykon/node/1714/robert_kuwa%C5%82ek
 Paweł P. Reszka, "Znany lubelski historyk nie żyje," Gazeta Wyborcza Lublin, 7 June 2014, http://lublin.gazeta.pl/lublin/1,48724,16113559,Znany_lubelski_historyk_nie_zyje__Mial_47_lat.html

References

20th-century Polish historians
Polish male non-fiction writers
1966 births
2014 deaths
21st-century Polish historians